War & Peace is an historical drama television serial first broadcast on BBC One on 3 January 2016, produced by BBC Cymru Wales, in association with The Weinstein Company, Lookout Point and BBC Worldwide. It is a six-part adaptation of the 1869 novel War and Peace by the Russian author Leo Tolstoy, written by Andrew Davies and directed by Tom Harper. War & Peace aired on A&E, Lifetime and History Channel in the United States as four two-hour episodes, beginning on 18 January 2016. The serial stars Paul Dano, Lily James and James Norton in the leading roles.

Plot
The saga begins in the Russian Empire in 1805. When Pierre (Paul Dano), Natasha (Lily James) and Andrei (James Norton) are first introduced to viewers, their youthful ambition, despite their privileged circumstances, is to find meaning in their lives. Kind-hearted but awkward Pierre, the illegitimate son of Russia's richest man, wants to change the world for the better. The spirited Natasha is searching for true love, while handsome and gallant Andrei, frustrated with the superficiality of society, seeks a higher purpose.

At the same time, the French army under Napoleon edges ever closer to Russia's borders. Natasha's older brother Nikolai (Jack Lowden) joins the Imperial Russian Army immediately and matures during the war against Napoleon. Like Pierre, Natasha and Andrei, he also experiences romantic vicissitudes: despite his childhood love for his cousin Sonya (Aisling Loftus), his impoverished parents insist he marry a rich bride like the superficial Julie Karagina or the religious Marya Bolkonskaya (Jessie Buckley).

Having begun with Napoleon's military campaign against Russia and Austria in 1805, the story concludes in 1812 after Napoleon's invasion of Russia has failed and he has retreated and withdrawn from Russian territory. The families at the centre of the saga have undergone major changes and lost members, but those remaining have experienced a transformation and a new life, with new growth and new families started.

Cast

Principal

 Paul Dano as Pierre Bezukhov
 Tuppence Middleton as Hélène Kuragina
 Callum Turner as Anatole Kuragin
 Stephen Rea as Prince Vassily Kuragin
 James Norton as Andrei Bolkonsky
 Jessie Buckley as Marya Bolkonskaya
 Jim Broadbent as Prince Nikolai Bolkonsky
 Jack Lowden as Nikolai Rostov
 Lily James as Natasha Rostova
 Aisling Loftus as Sonya Rostova
 Adrian Edmondson as Count Ilya Rostov
 Greta Scacchi as Countess Natalya Rostova
 Kenneth Cranham as Uncle Mikhail
 Rebecca Front as Anna Mikhaylovna Drubetskaya
 Aneurin Barnard as Boris Drubetskoy
 Tom Burke as Fyodor Dolokhov
 Mathieu Kassovitz as Napoleon Bonaparte
 Brian Cox as General Mikhail Kutuzov
 Ken Stott as Osip Alexeevich Bazdeev
 Gillian Anderson as Anna Pavlovna Scherer

Supporting
 Kate Phillips as Lise Bolkonskaya
 Olivia Ross as Mademoiselle Bourienne
 Thomas Arnold as Vaska Denisov
 Adrian Rawlins as Platon Karataev
 Fenella Woolgar as Catiche Kuragina
 David Quilter as Tikhon
 Ben Lloyd-Hughes as Tsar Alexander
 Otto Farrant as Petya Rostov
 Kit Connor as Young Petya Rostov
 Chloe Pirrie as Julie Karagina
 Rory Keenan as Bilibin
 Terence Beesley as General Bennigsen
 Pip Torrens as Prince Bagration
 Guillaume Faure as Napoleon's Adjutant
 Ludger Pistor as General Mack

Production
The series, a British-American co-production, was announced by Danny Cohen on 18 February 2013 and was commissioned by him and Ben Stephenson, the controller of BBC Drama. The production by BBC Cymru Wales is partnered by The Weinstein Company, Lookout Point and BBC Worldwide.

The cast was announced on 28 December 2014.

The executive producers are Faith Penhale, George Ormond, Andrew Davies, Simon Vaughan, Robert Walak and Harvey Weinstein. The director is Tom Harper. The soundtrack was composed by Martin Phipps.

The series was filmed in Russia, Lithuania, and Latvia with Arri Alexa digital cameras. Anamorphic lenses were used, for their bokeh focus fall-off effects.

Episodes

Broadcasts
In the UK the drama consists of five 60-minute episodes and one 82-minute finale, broadcast on BBC One beginning 3 January 2016 at 9 pm.

In the U.S. broadcasting began on 18 January 2016 and the series was simulcast across three networks: A&E, Lifetime, and History Channel. It aired in four two-hour blocks over four weeks, at 9 pm ET/PT, on Lifetime.
In Canada, the show airs at the same time and in the same format as in the United States, but only on A&E.

It aired in Australia on BBC First from 31 January 2016.

The serial will also air in Sweden (SVT), Denmark (TV 2), Norway (NRK), Estonia (ETV), Germany (RTL Passion), Greece (OTE), Lithuania (LNK), Israel (YES), Russia (Channel One), China (LeEco), Taiwan (LeEco), India (Vuclip), South Korea (KBS and SK), Philippines (ABS-CBN, Lifestyle), Belgium (BBC First), the Netherlands (BBC First), Luxembourg (BBC First), Portugal (RTP), Japan (NHK) and Czech republic (Česká televize).

The show has also been sold to France2, Finland's YLE, NRK in Norway, RUV in Iceland, Latvia's LTV and TRBC in Ukraine.

Reception
On Rotten Tomatoes, a review aggregator website, the series received a "Certified Fresh" score of 88% with an average rating of 8.4 out of 10 from 25 reviews. The website's consensus reads: "War & Peace boasts sumptuous visuals and the narrative remains largely faithful to its sprawling source material, even if the pace may challenge less patient viewers and the period detail is slightly lacking." Metacritic assigned the series a weighted average score of 72 out of 100 based on 11 critics, indicating "generally favorable reviews".

The Telegraph placed it fifth in its list of the greatest television adaptations of all time, stating "[I]t is safe to say that this is the greatest TV costume drama of the past decade and has raised the bar in a genre for which we are already renowned all over the world."

A world-premiere press screening of the first episode was held in London on 14 December 2015, after which a first-look review in The Telegraph pronounced it "breathtaking". Andrew Billen of The Times gave the first episode four out of five. Viv Groskop in The Guardian wrote, "It's tonally perfect, striking exactly the right balance between drama and wit, action and emotion, passion and humour".
The second episode received five out of five from Andrew Billen in The Times. The ball towards the end of the third episode received particular attention, with Digital Spy describing it as "the most spellbinding moment of television we'll see this year". Benji Wilson from The Telegraph described the third episode as a "dazzling mazurka of roiling passions and misplaced affection", giving five out of five. The feature-length finale received five out of five from The Telegraph.

Home media
The entire series of War & Peace was released on DVD and Blu-ray in the United Kingdom and Ireland on 8 February 2016 by BBC DVD. Special features include making-of featurettes.

Notes

References

External links
 
 
 War & Peace at Rotten Tomatoes
War & Peace with Armenian translation

BBC television dramas
2016 British television series debuts
2016 British television series endings
2010s British drama television series
Television shows set in Russia
2010s British television miniseries
English-language television shows
Television shows based on Russian novels
Films based on War and Peace
Costume drama television series
Television series set in the 1800s
Television series set in the 1810s
Television series by BBC Studios
Television series by The Weinstein Company
Napoleonic Wars films